The 2016 Cork Premier Intermediate Football Championship was the 11th staging of the Cork Premier Intermediate Football Championship since its establishment by the Cork County Board in 2006. The championship began on 23 April 2016 and ended on 23 October 2016.

On 23 October 2016, Kiskeam won the championship following a 2-12 to 0-14 defeat of Fermoy in the final at Páirc Uí Rinn. It was their first ever championship title.

Éire Óg's Daniel Goulding was the championship's top scorer with 1-36.

Results

Round 1

Round 2A

Round 2B

Relegation playoffs

Round 3

Quarter-finals

Semi-finals

Final

Championship statistics

Top scorers

Overall

In a single game

References

Cork Premier Intermediate Football Championship